Leighfield Forest SSSI is an  biological Site of Special Scientific Interest east of Skeffington in Leicestershire, England. It consists of several fragments, including Tugby Wood, Loddington Reddish, Brown's Wood, Skeffington Wood and Tilton Wood, of the former medieval hunting Leighfield Forest, which straddles Leicestershire and Rutland. It is a Nature Conservation Review site, Grade II. 

These woods in the Eye Brook valley date back at least to the thirteenth century. The dominant trees are ash and oak. The diverse moths and beetles include some rare species, and others are at the northern limit of their distribution. There are also areas of grassland and marsh.

Roads and footpaths go through some of the woods but others are private.

References

Sites of Special Scientific Interest in Leicestershire